One for All – All for One  is the fourth studio album by the Japanese power metal band Galneryus. It was released on August 22, 2007. The single "Everlasting" from this album was used as the opening theme for the TV music programme Music BB broadcast on MXTV and other network stations.

Track listing

Credits
 Syu: Guitar, throat
 Yama-B: Vocal
 Yu-To: Bass
 Junichi: Drums
 Yukhi: Keyboards, Hammond organ

Chart performance
The album reached number 53 on the Oricon album charts.

References

External links
 Official Galneryus website 

Galneryus albums
2007 albums